Austrocylindropuntia is a genus of cacti (family Cactaceae) with 11 recognized species, which were once included in the genus Opuntia. Some are native to South America.

Species

External links
 Cactaceae:  Members of the genus Austrocylindropuntia

Cacti of South America
Opuntioideae genera
Opuntioideae